San Ramón station  is a metro station located on Line 4A of the Santiago Metro in Santiago, Chile between Santa Rosa and La Cisterna station. It lies along the Vespucio Sur Freeway, near its junction with Almirante Latorre Street. The station has disabled access. The station was opened on 16 August 2006 as part of the inaugural section of the line between Vicuña Mackenna and La Cisterna.

In the surrounding area can be found the San Ramón commune municipality building and La Bandera Park.

Etymology
The station is named after San Ramón commune, where it is located.

References

External links 
San Ramón municipality website (in Spanish)
Metro de Santiago website (in Spanish)

Santiago Metro stations
Santiago Metro Line 4A